AKM Samsuzzoha (1924 – 20 February 1987) was a Bangladesh Awami League politician. He was a Member of Parliament from Narayanganj constituency. He received the Independence Day Award in 2011 posthumously from the Government of Bangladesh.

Early life and education
Samsuzzoha was born in 1924 to politician M Osman Ali and Jamila Osman. He graduated from the University of Dhaka.

Career
Samsuzzoha was a founding member of Awami Muslim League. He was involved in the Bengali Language Movement of 1952 that demanded Bengali be made a state language of Pakistan. He was elected a member of parliament at the Pakistani general election in 1970 and Bangladeshi general election in 1973.

Personal life
Samsuzzoha was married to Nagina Zoha. Three of his sons went on to win parliamentary elections – Salim Osman and Nasim Osman were elected from the Jatiya Party, and Shamim Osman is member of Parliament from Bangladesh Awami League.

Samsuzzoha died on 20 February 1987.

References

1924 births
1987 deaths
People from Narayanganj District
University of Dhaka alumni
Awami League politicians
Recipients of the Independence Day Award
Date of birth missing
Place of death missing
1st Jatiya Sangsad members